The Soul Brotherhood is an album by organist Charles Kynard which was recorded in 1969 and released on the Prestige label.

Reception

Allmusic awarded the album 4½ stars stating "From the title track, Kynard has the proceedings firmly in hand, his sweeping right hand carries both the middle and the high registers of the instrument in a flighty idiomatic spiral of harmonic invention that never leaves its root in the blues".

Track listing 
All compositions by Charles Kynard except as noted
 "The Soul Brotherhood" - 6:06   
 "Big City" (Marvin Jenkins) - 7:22   
 "Jealjon" - 7:40   
 "Piece O' Pisces" (David "Fathead" Newman) - 10:00   
 "Blue Farouq" (Blue Mitchell) - 8:55

Personnel 
Charles Kynard - organ
Blue Mitchell - trumpet
David "Fathead" Newman - tenor saxophone
Grant Green - guitar
Jimmy Lewis - electric bass
Mickey Roker - drums

References 

Charles Kynard albums
1969 albums
Prestige Records albums
Albums produced by Bob Porter (record producer)
Albums recorded at Van Gelder Studio